The 2023 Boise mayoral election will be held in 2023 to determine the mayor of Boise, Idaho. The election will be officially nonpartisan. Incumbent Democratic mayor Lauren McLean is running for re-election to a second term in office.

Candidates

Declared
Lauren McLean, incumbent mayor

References

External links
Official campaign websites
 Lauren McLean (D) for Mayor

Boise
Mayoral elections in Boise, Idaho
History of Boise, Idaho
Government of Boise, Idaho
Boise